The Zion Christian Church is an independent Japanese church that was founded by Reverend Kishida Aiji (岸田愛治) in 1934. It is a member of the Japan Evangelical Association (JEA) and the Japan Holiness Association (JHA).

History
In 1934, Reverend Kishida Aiji began work in Tokyo's Ōta ward. Since then, church membership has spread to Kanagawa and Ibaraki Prefectures.

See also
Holiness movement

External links
Zion Christian Church, Aomori
Zion Christian Church, Chigasaki
Zion Christian Church, Yokohama

Christian evangelical denominations in Japan
1934 establishments in Japan
Holiness denominations